Jagannath Rout (13 November 1942 – 24 January 2020) was an Indian politician from Odisha belonging to Indian National Congress. He was a legislator of the Odisha Legislative Assembly. He also served as a minister of the Government of Odisha.

Biography
Rout was born on 13 November 1942. He was elected as a legislator of the Odisha Legislative Assembly  from Dhamnagar in 1980, 1985 and 1995. He resigned from his legislator post on 16 March 1999.

Rout also served as a minister of the Government of Odisha. He served as the Industry Minister 7 December 1989 to 3 March 1990, Health and Family Welfare Minister from 21 March 1995 to 14 August 1998 and Urban Development Minister from 24 August 1998 to 17 February 1999.

Rout died of cardiac arrest on 24 January 2020 at the age of 77.

References

1942 births
2020 deaths
Odisha MLAs 1980–1985
Odisha MLAs 1985–1990
Odisha MLAs 1995–2000
Indian National Congress politicians from Odisha
People from Bhadrak district
State cabinet ministers of Odisha